Pabstiella versicolor is a species of orchid plant native to Brazil.

References 

versicolor
Flora of Brazil